Ramaz Paliani (born 21 August 1973 in Mestia, Georgia) is a Georgian boxer who has won World and European Championships in the men's featherweight division.

He has represented Turkey, Georgia, and Russia in international competitions, including appearances in the 1992, 1996, and 2000 Olympic Games. He was nicknamed "Razzamatazz".

Pro
Known as "Razzamatazz", Paliani turned pro in 2002 and didn't lose in his first 15 fights.  His most notable fight was a draw against prospect David Diaz (boxer) in 2005. 
In 2006 he was knocked out, however. His record is 14-1-1.

External links
 
 Profile

1973 births
Living people
People from Samegrelo-Zemo Svaneti
Male boxers from Georgia (country)
Fenerbahçe boxers
Boxers at the 1992 Summer Olympics
Boxers at the 1996 Summer Olympics
Boxers at the 2000 Summer Olympics
Olympic boxers of the Unified Team
Olympic boxers of Russia
Olympic boxers of Turkey
Olympic bronze medalists for the Unified Team
Olympic medalists in boxing
Featherweight boxers
Soviet male boxers
Russian male boxers
Turkish male boxers
AIBA World Boxing Championships medalists
Medalists at the 1992 Summer Olympics

Mediterranean Games gold medalists for Turkey
Competitors at the 2001 Mediterranean Games
Mediterranean Games medalists in boxing